Mohammad Shamsuddin (born 15 September 1983) is a Bangladeshi sprinter. He competed in the men's 100 metres at the 2004 Summer Olympics. He was student of Islamic University, Bangladesh.

References

External links
 

1983 births
Living people
Athletes (track and field) at the 2004 Summer Olympics
Bangladeshi male sprinters
Olympic athletes of Bangladesh
Place of birth missing (living people)
Islamic University, Bangladesh alumni